East Manchester Township is a township in York County, Pennsylvania, USA. As of the 2020 census, the township population was 8,327.

History
Michael and Magdealena Bixler Farmstead, also known as John Rudy County Park, was listed on the National Register of Historic Places in 2000.

Geography
The township surrounds the boroughs of Manchester and Mount Wolf, located side by side at the center of the township.

Demographics
As of the census of 2000, there were 5,078 people, 1,926 households, and 1,504 families living in the township. The population density was 305.5 people per square mile (118.0/km2). There were 1,986 housing units at an average density of 119.5/sq mi (46.1/km2). The racial makeup of the township was 97.40% White, 1.04% African American, 0.20% Native American, 0.67% Asian, 0.26% from other races, and 0.43% from two or more races.  Hispanic or Latino of any race were 0.93% of the population.

There were 1,926 households, out of which 35.2% had children under the age of 18 living with them, 67.4% were married couples living together, 6.8% had a female householder with no husband present, and 21.9% were non-families. 17.9% of all households were made up of individuals, and 7.2% had someone living alone who was 65 years of age or older. The average household size was 2.64 and the average family size was 2.97.

In the township the population was spread out, with 24.6% under the age of 18, 5.7% from 18 to 24, 33.5% from 25 to 44, 25.0% from 45 to 64, and 11.2% who were 65 years of age or older. The median age was 37 years. For every 100 females there were 100.8 males. For every 100 females age 18 and over, there were 98.3 males.

The median income for a household in the township was $49,417, and the median income for a family was $56,186. Males had a median income of $38,672 versus $26,506 for females. The per capita income for the township was $20,559.  About 1.5% of families and 2.6% of the population were below the poverty line, including 1.5% of those under the age of 18 and 3.4% of those ages 65 and older.

Education
East Manchester Township is served by the Northeastern York School District.

Economy
East Manchester Township is home to one of only four Starbucks roasting facilities in the world.

References

Populated places established in 1735
Townships in York County, Pennsylvania